Lazaros Efthymiou  (Greek: Λάζαρος Ευθυμίου; born 19 April 1999) is a Cypriot footballer who plays as a defender for the Yale Bulldogs.

Anorthosis Famagusta

Debut
Lazaros Efthymiou made his debut for Anorthosis in a match against AEK Larnaca.

College career
Lazaros is currently a sophomore. He is retired from the men's soccer team at Yale University, having made four appearances as a freshman.

References

External links

1999 births
Living people
Cypriot footballers
Anorthosis Famagusta F.C. players
Cypriot First Division players
Association football defenders